This is a record of every season of Blackpool Football Club in English and European football, from 1896 to 1897, their first season in the Football League, to their current campaign. It details the club's achievements in major competitions and the top scorers in the League for each season.

Note: The 1945–46 post-War season statistics are not recognised officially.

Seasons

Key

P – Played
W – Games won
D – Games drawn
L – Games lost
GF – Goals for
GA – Goals against
Pts – Points
Pos – Final position

Prem – Premier League
Champ – EFL Championship
Lge 1 – EFL League One
Lge 2 – EFL League Two
Div 1 – Football League First Division
Div 2 – Football League Second Division
Div 3 – Football League Third Division
Div 4 – Football League Fourth Division
FL N – Football League North
Lancs – Lancashire League
n/a – Not applicable

QR – Qualifying round
PR – Preliminary round
INT – Intermediate round
GS – Group stage
R1 – First round
R2 – Second round
R3 – Third round
R4 – Fourth round
R5 – Fifth round
QF – Quarter-finals
SF – Semi-finals
F – Regional final
RU – Runners-up
W – Winners
(N) – Northern section of regionalised stage

Footnotes

References
General
Calley, Roy (1992). Blackpool: A Complete Record 1887–1992. Breedon Books Sport. .

Soccerbase.com

Specific

 
Blackpool F.C.